Rudnyansky (masculine), Rudnyanskaya (feminine), or Rudnyanskoye (neuter) may refer to:
Rudnyansky District, several districts in Russia
Rudnyanskoye Urban Settlement, several municipal urban settlements in Russia